Rupes Recta is a linear fault on the Moon, in the southeastern part of the Mare Nubium at . The name is Latin for straight cliff, although it is more commonly called the Straight Wall. This is the most well-known escarpment on the Moon, and is a popular target for amateur astronomers.

When the sun illuminates the feature at an oblique angle at about day 8 of the Moon's orbit, the Rupes Recta casts a wide shadow that gives it the appearance of a steep cliff. The fault has a length of 110 km, a typical width of 2–3 km, and a height of 240–300 m. Thus although it appears to be a vertical cliff in the lunar surface, in actuality the grade of the slope is relatively shallow.

To the west of this escarpment is the crater Birt, which is about 17 km in diameter.  Also to the west is the Rima Birt rille. At the southern end is a group of hills often called the "Stag's-Horn Mountains", although this name is not officially recognized by the IAU.

To the northeast is the crater Alpetragius, and to the east is Thebit.

References

External links

 – mosaic image of Rupes Recta from the LROC WAC.
 
 
 
 
 
 
 
 
 

Escarpments on the Moon